Misty Eyed Adventures is a music album by Irish musician Máire Brennan, now known as Moya Brennan. This was the second solo outing for her and features many of her family and friends on the recording. It was released in 1995.

Recordings were made in Scotland during 1995:

Castle Sound Studio, Pencaitland, Scotland – (Engineer Calum Malcolm)
Additional recordings
Windmill Lane Studios, Dublin, Ireland – (Engineer Charles Byrne) (for Big Yellow Taxi)
Barrymore Studios, Co. Clare, Ireland – (Engineer Colin Boland) (for A Place Among The Stones)

Track listing
"The Days of the Dancing" – 5:26
"A Place Among the Stones" – 6:45 (produced by Davy Spillane & Greg Boland)
"The Watchman" – 5:46
"An Fharraige" – 5:04
"Pilgrim's Way" – 4:17
"Big Yellow Taxi" – 4:10 (produced by The Blue Nile)
"The Mighty One" – 4:34
"Heroes" – 6:20
"Misty Eyed Adventures" – 5:34
"Dream On" – 4:38
"Éirigh Suas a Stóirín" – 4:02

Personnel

Band
Moya Brennan – vocals, harp, keyboards
Deirdre Brennan – vocals
Olive Brennan – vocals
Brídín Brennan – vocals
Nigel Thomas – drums
Nico Bruce – bass
Davy Spillane – Uilleann pipes, low whistles
Dónal Lunny – acoustic & electric bouzouki, bodhrán, keyboards
Calum Malcolm – keyboards, synth bass

Additional musicians
Paul Buchanan – Acoustic Guitar (on Big Yellow Taxi)
P.J. Moore – Keyboards (on Big Yellow Taxi)
Robert Bell – Bass, Keyboards (on Big Yellow Taxi)
Greg Boland – Electric Guitar (on A Place Among The Stones)
Noel Eccles – Percussion (on A Place Among The Stones)
James Delaney – Keyboards (on A Place Among The Stones)
Eoghan O'Neill – Bass (on A Place Among The Stones)

Promotional singles
"Big Yellow Taxi"
"The Days of the Dancing"

Release details
1994, UK, BMG Records 7432 123355 2, Release Date ? November 1994, CD 
1994, UK, BMG Records 7432 123355 4, Release Date ? November 1994, Cassette
1994, USA, Atlantic Records 82701 2, Release Date ? November 1994, CD 
1994, Japan, BMG Records BVCP 784, Release Date ? November 1994, CD

External links
 This album at Northern Skyline

Moya Brennan albums
1995 albums
Atlantic Records albums